Split weight training is a type of exercise workout. It involves dividing training routines by body region, muscle group or movement.

Workout Splits

Push/Pull/Legs
Firstly, the push muscles consisting of the chest, shoulder, and triceps. Example exercises are the barbell bench press, incline barbell press, barbell shoulder press, dip, and triceps push down. Separately, the exercises for pull muscles (back, biceps, abdominal, calves and legs) are pull ups, sit-ups, barbell curls and standing calf raises. The two workouts are performed on separate days.

Upper/Lower Body
Workout sessions are usually divided between the upper- and lower body, which often includes the abdominal muscles. 
Typical workouts for an upper body routine include the bench press, biceps curls, lateral raises, seated lateral pull-downs and barbell rows. Lower body routines often include the leg-press, squats, leg extensions and leg curls.

Arnold Split
The Arnold Split consists of 3 different workout routines: chest/back, shoulders/arms and core/legs. It is named after Arnold Schwarzenegger, who popularized the routine during his preparations for the second Mr Olympia.

Double Split 
Training a full workout in the morning and evening with at least 8 to 10 hours rest between.

Advantages 
Advantages of split weight training include:

Less time spent per workout
Less possibility of over-training
More time to individually focus on certain muscle groups

References

External links 

Weight training exercises